The 1962 NCAA College Division basketball tournament involved 32 schools playing in a single-elimination tournament to determine the national champion of men's NCAA College Division college basketball as a culmination of the 1961–62 NCAA College Division men's basketball season. It was won by Mount St. Mary's University and Sacramento State's Ron Rohrer was the Most Outstanding Player.

Regional participants

Regionals

Northeast - Rochester, New York
Location: Louis Alexander Palestra Host: University of Rochester

Third Place - St. Anselm 83, Rochester 64

South Central - Evansville, Indiana
Location: Roberts Municipal Stadium Host: Evansville College

Third Place - North Carolina A&T 84, Union 80

East - Reading, Pennsylvania
Location: Bollman Center Host: Albright College

Third Place - Albright 65, C. W. Post 59

Mideast - Akron, Ohio
Location: Memorial Hall Host: Municipal University of Akron

Third Place - Youngstown State 58, Gannon 52

Pacific Coast - Sacramento, California
Location: Hornet Gym Host: Sacramento State College

Third Place - Seattle Pacific 73, Fresno State 68

Great Lakes - Valparaiso, Indiana
Location: Athletics-Recreation Center Host: Valparaiso University

Third Place - Kentucky State 77, Illinois State 72

Southwest - Jonesboro, Arkansas
Location: Indian Fieldhouse Host: Arkansas State College

Third Place - Lamar 83, Abilene Christian 74

Midwest - Lincoln, Nebraska
Location: Ira J. Taylor Gymnasium Host: Nebraska Wesleyan College

Third Place - Hamline 76, Grinnell 68

*denotes each overtime played

National Finals - Evansville, Indiana
Location: Roberts Municipal Stadium Host: Evansville College

Third Place - Southern Illinois 98, Nebraska Wesleyan 81

*denotes each overtime played

All-tournament team
 Jim Mumford (Nebraska Wesleyan)
 John O'Reilly (Mount Saint Mary's)
 Ed Pfeiffer (Mount Saint Mary's)
 Ron Rohrer (Sacramento State)
 Ed Spila (Southern Illinois)

See also
 1962 NCAA University Division basketball tournament
 1962 NAIA Basketball Tournament

References

Sources
 2010 NCAA Men's Basketball Championship Tournament Records and Statistics: Division II men's basketball Championship
 1962 NCAA College Division Men's Basketball Tournament jonfmorse.com

NCAA Division II men's basketball tournament
Tournament
NCAA College Division basketball tournament
NCAA College Division basketball tournament